Tabernaemontana debrayi is a species of plant in the family Apocynaceae. It is found in northern Madagascar.

References

debrayi